Anachalcoplacis is a genus of leaf beetles in the subfamily Eumolpinae. It is known from South America.

Species
 Anachalcoplacis amazonica (Jacoby, 1899)
 Anachalcoplacis andicola (Bechyné, 1950)
 Anachalcoplacis clermonti (Bechyné, 1954)
 Anachalcoplacis clermonti concinna (Bechyné, 1954)
 Anachalcoplacis clermonti minutula (Bechyné, 1965)
 Anachalcoplacis concinna (Weise, 1921)
 Anachalcoplacis fulva (Fabricius, 1801)
 Anachalcoplacis fulva fulva (Fabricius, 1801)
 Anachalcoplacis fulva grandis B. Bechyné, 1983
 Anachalcoplacis fulva macrosoma (Bechyné, 1958)
 Anachalcoplacis fulva melanitarsis (Bechyné, 1958)
 Anachalcoplacis tenella B. Bechyné, 1983

References

Eumolpinae
Chrysomelidae genera
Beetles of South America